M5/A5/Metroad 5 is one of Brisbane's  Road Routes, running from Yamanto to Kedron and the Inner City Bypass. It is the main western bypass of Brisbane city.

Route
  Legacy Way Mount Coot-tha to Inner City Bypass
 Variously named roads through Toowong (Mount Coot-tha Road, Fredrick Street), Bardon (Rouen Road, Boundary Road, Macregor Terrace, Jubilee Terrace), Ashgrove,(Jubilee Terrace, Stewart Road, Wardell Street) Everton Park, Stafford and Kedron. It takes a different course from the northern half of M5, going directly through the northwestern suburbs, hence may appear as the legacy 'business route' alternative.
  Western Freeway: Moggill Road (Indooroopilly) to Milton Road, Toowong
 Centenary Motorway: Moggil Road (Indooroopilly) to Springfield
  Centenary Highway Springfield to Yamanto

Major intersections
The component roads (but not the suburban streets from Toowong to Kedron, which do not have Wikipedia articles) have road junction lists.

Brisbane Metroads